Don't Be Fooled by the Name is the second studio album by British glam rock band Geordie. Mick Rock was responsible for the cover art and photography.

Track listing

The origin of "Mercenary Man" song has been superseded in reissued editions by single version of "Mercenary Man" (6:17).

Personnel 
Brian Johnson- vocals
Vic Malcolm - guitar
Tom Hill - bass guitar
Brian Gibson - drums

References 

1974 albums
Geordie (band) albums
Albums with cover art by Mick Rock